Ding Lieyun (born 22 November 1955) is a Chinese management scientist and educator. He served as the president of Northeastern University and is the current president of Huazhong University of Science and Technology. He was elected a member of Chinese Academy of Engineering in 2015.

Life and career
Ding was born on 22 November 1955 in Honghu, Hubei. He completed his undergraduate study in Wuhan College of Building Materials Industry in 1982, and received his master of industrial management engineering from Wuhan Polytechnic University in 1987. In 2002, he got his doctor of industrial management engineering from Tongji University.

He served as the vice-president of Wuhan Institute of Urban Construction from 1994 to 1999, and the president from 1999 to 2000. After he received his doctor's degree, he served as the vice-president of Huazhong University of Science and Technology and the director of the university's National Laboratory of Defense Technology from 2000 to 2003. Then he served as the party committee secretary of Central China Normal University from 2003 to 2011, the president of Northeastern University from 2011 to 2014, and the president of HUST from 2014.

Research
Ding led the design of digital management systems of urban rail transit construction project in China. He proposed 3 kinds of system architecture based on Computer Integrated Construction. This system was used in the construction of Shenyang Metro. Ding and his colleagues also developed a computer system to automatically identificate and pre-warn the security risks in rail transit construction.

References

1955 births
Living people
Engineers from Hubei
Educators from Hubei
Members of the Chinese Academy of Engineering
Presidents of Huazhong University of Science and Technology
People from Jingzhou
Tongji University alumni
Academic staff of the Central China Normal University
Academic staff of the Northeastern University (China)